The Battle of Otterlo was fought in the Netherlands on 16-17 April 1945. German soldiers were encircled on the De Hoge Veluwe National Park and unexpectedly attacked the already liberated Dutch village Otterlo, leading to fierce fighting in hand-to-hand combat. It resulted in an Allied victory, thanks to the deployment of flamethrower tanks, and considerable German losses.

Background 
In April 1945, the western allies liberated large areas in the Netherlands above the river Rhine. In the context of defeating Nazi-Germany, the army movements had their focus to go north as soon as possible; resulting in the liberation of Groningen at 13-16 April 1945. As a flank protection, an area called 'the Veluwe' was liberated from 14 to 18 April 1945 by the use of two military operations: operation Cleanser and operation Cannonshot. As a result, the troops on the Veluwe were encircled in a pocket which was expected to result in a surrender. Otterlo was liberated on 16 April 1945 during operation Cleanser by Canadian and British troops. The main army moved on to Barneveld, while a couple of units were stationed in and around Otterlo. However, German troops assembled in the village Hoenderloo upon which they decided to break out of this pocket. It was their goal to join the German forces in what they called 'Festung Holland'. They expected that a last stand would have taken place in the Randstad; a battle that eventually never happened. As a big surprise to the allies (the military intelligence completely overlooked the gathering in Hoenderloo), the German troops decided to attack Otterlo during the night of 17 April. These were troops from the 361 Volksgrenadier Division, Regiment 952

The battle 
Around midnight, the first German troops surrounded and attacked a small squad that was located outside of Otterlo, as a distraction. According to the regiment's diary, about 25 soldiers raced into Otterlo next and started shooting around. About 800-1000 German soldiers attacked the village from the north, resulting in fierce fighting and hand-to-hand combat. The fighting continued the whole night, including an artillery attack at about 04.30 hours in the morning. The Germans were winning, until a couple of allied WASPS (flamethrowers) and regular tanks appeared on the battlefield and turned the tide. They were informed on the fighting by a couple of allied soldiers that retreated into the woods and ran into a couple of scouts by pure coincidence. These scouts originated from a small tank division that was located at the Kröller-Müller museum. Many German casualties were caused by the flamethrowers, as witnessed by local civilians.

Casualties 
According to the grave memorial in Otterlo, 17 Canadians and 6 British soldiers lost their lives. No civilians lost their lives during the night, although four civilians had died during the earlier liberation of Otterlo at 15 and 16 April and are therefore mentioned as well. On the German side, the precise amount is still unclear. There are 62 known German graves: 24 bodies in a local mass grave (cleared in 1949) and 37 bodies buried at the German war cemetery in Ysselsteyn. However, eyewitness accounts, the war correspondence reports and the regiment diary report much more dead Germans (including many teenage soldiers). Most numbers varies between 150 and 200, with a radio podcast of CBC mentioning up to 400 deaths.

See also 
 The Battle of Otterlo (documentary)
 Traces of War

References 

1945 in the Netherlands
April 1945 events
Otterlo
Otterlo
Otterlo